Gornal is a village and electoral ward in the Dudley Metropolitan Borough, in the West Midlands of England. It encompasses the three historical villages of Upper Gornal, Lower Gornal, and Gornal Wood. Gornal was historically part of Staffordshire, prior to the creation of the West Midlands County in 1974. Gornal is 11 miles from Birmingham.

The three Gornal villages were originally a part of the ancient manor of Sedgley until 1894, when the area became part of Sedgley Urban District. In 1966, along with most of the rest of Sedgley, it was merged into the County Borough of Dudley. Since 1974, it has been part of the larger Metropolitan Borough of Dudley.

Gornal stone, a variety of limestone, originates in Gornal.

Himley Hall and Park and Baggeridge Country Park are notable nearby visitor attractions.

Areas

Upper Gornal
Situated south of Sedgley on the main A459 road, the area has undergone extensive private and council housing development since the 1920s. It was the target of three bombs by the German Luftwaffe during World War II, though no buildings were damaged and there were no civilian casualties.

Upper Gornal formerly had a small cinema, the Jack Darby Picture House, from the early 20th century, but it closed in 1960 due to competition from other nearby theatres. The building now houses a small hardware store. Also of note, the local landmark Pig on the Wall public house was controversially demolished in 2002 to make way for a McDonald's restaurant. Another landmark was The Green Dragon public house which is now an Indian restaurant.

Lower Gornal
Lower Gornal is located southwest of Upper Gornal, and includes the three schools in the local area – Roberts Primary, Red Hall Primary, and Ellowes Hall Sports College. First built in 1894, the original building of Roberts Primary School was demolished in 2000 following the completion of a new £6million building. Red Hall was formed around 1900 as an infant, junior and secondary school; but the secondary school closed in 1964 when Ellowes Hall opened. Ellowes Hall itself was named after the Ellowes Hall House that previously stood on the site, prior to its demolition in 1964.

Gornal Athletic F.C., a football team currently in the Premier Division of the West Midlands (Regional) League, are based in Lower Gornal.

The local legend – 'Pig on the wall'
One, not entirely apocryphal, episode from Lower Gornal's past occurred when Enoch and Eli (Aynock and Ayli in the local dialect – the two fictional characters to which local jokes are usually attributed) "put the pig on the wall to watch the band go by". Local legend has it, that once, a military band marched through the suburb, and caused such great excitement amongst the residents, that not only did many people flock to see it, but one person even put his pig on the wall to afford the animal a better view. This phrase has long been part of the local idiolect, but its origins still remain obscure. There was even a hotel in the Upper Gornal area of the town called the "Pig on the Wall". It was originally called the Bricklayer's Arms and known locally as Hammond's after the long time owners, but took up its new name in 1985. It was however demolished and replaced with a McDonald's restaurant in late 2002.

Gornal Wood
Gornal Wood is on the western boundary of the Dudley Metropolitan Borough, and contains a small shopping area, including a library. It is the site of the Crooked House pub, a famous landmark known because of its distinctive appearance as a result of mining subsidence.

Gornal Wood Crematorium and Cemetery is also in this area, having opened in 1960.

The X10 bus route operated by National Express running from Birmingham city centre terminates here. Other services are the 223, 27/27a and 17 operated by Diamond Bus.

Notable events

2002 earthquake
The epicentre of the 2002 Dudley earthquake was located in Gornal Wood. It measured 4.8 on the Richter magnitude scale and could be felt as far away as North Yorkshire.

Notable residents
Former BBC newsreader Sue Lawley was born in Dudley in 1946 and grew up in Lower Gornal.

See also
Gornal Athletic F.C.
List of areas in Dudley
Straits Estate

Notes

References

External links
More details of the 'Pig on the Wall' and its urban legend
The Ancient Manor of Sedgley – Local History website
Sedgley Local History Society website
 Map

Areas of Dudley